Sir Howard Montagu Colvin  (15 October 1919 – 27 December 2007) was a British architectural historian who produced two of the most outstanding works of scholarship in his field: A Biographical Dictionary of British Architects, 1600–1840 and The History of the King's Works.

Life and works

Born in Sidcup, Colvin was educated at Trent College and University College London. In 1948, he became a Fellow of St John's College, Oxford where he remained until his death in 2007. He was a member of the Royal Commission on the Historical Monuments of England 1963–76, the Historic Buildings Council for England 1970–84, the Royal Fine Art Commission 1962–72, and other official bodies.

He is most notably the author of A Biographical Dictionary of British Architects, 1600–1840 which appeared in its original form in 1954. Yale University Press produced a third edition in 1995, and he had just completed his work on the fourth edition  at the time of his death. On first publication this reference work of heroic scale immediately became the standard in its field: it "changed the face of English architectural history", according to David Watkin. In the revised edition, Colvin expanded the range to include Scottish and Welsh architects as well. 

The work includes every building within its time range with which the name of an architect can be associated, based on documentary evidence from extensive archival research, both by him and a growing network of correspondents. He was particularly an enemy of attributions based on style alone. This resulted in an index that is an architectural gazetteer, and which also gives a comprehensive listing of architectural books published in Britain, listed by author. The prefatory essay, "The Practice of Architecture, 1600–1840", is divided into two sections, covering the building trades and the architectural profession, both contributions to the broader social history of Britain.

He also was general editor, and wrote large parts, of the official multi-volume study of all the buildings with which the Crown had been associated through history, The History of the King's Works, published in stages between 1963 and 1982.

Colvin's work in government parallels his academic achievement. Just as he rose to become the acknowledged authority within academia, he also rose via membership of the bodies listed above and others to be Chair of the committee of English Heritage that dealt with Britain's built environment. 

His most famous coup was to lead a campaign which succeeded in inducing the then Chancellor of the Exchequer Nigel Lawson to alter the 1984 Budget so as to save Calke Abbey in Derbyshire for the nation.

Honours
Colvin was knighted in 1995. He served as president of the Society of Architectural Historians of Great Britain 1979–81; and a special issue of its journal Architectural History was produced in his honour in 1984.

Personal life
Colvin married Christina Edgeworth Butler, a literary scholar and historian of Oxfordshire, in 1943; they had two sons. She predeceased him in 2003.

Archive and library 
Colvin's research papers and correspondence associated with the Dictionary of British Architects, 1600–1840 are held in the archives of the Paul Mellon Centre in London. These arrived along with a number of architectural history publications including country house guidebooks which were bequeathed to the Paul Mellon Centre's library.

Publications

The History of the King's Works
 London: HMSO (1963–1982)
 Vol. 1–2: The Middle Ages, R. Allen Brown, H. M. Colvin, and A. J. Taylor  (also includes plans 1–4)
 Vol. 3: 1485–1660, part 1, H.M. Colvin, D. R. Ransome, John Summerson 
 Vol. 4: 1485–1660, part 2, H.M. Colvin, D. R. Ransome, John Summerson 
 Vol. 5: 1660–1782, H.M. Colvin, J. Mordaunt Crook, Kerry Downes, John Newman 
 Vol. 6: 1782–1851, J. Mordaunt Crook, M. H. Port 
 Plans 5–7

Other works

Entries for Charles Long, 1st Baron Farnborough and Isaac de Caus in the Oxford Dictionary of National Biography
Calke Abbey Derbyshire, a Hidden House Revealed. 1985 National Trust.

References

Sources

External links
Obituary in The Independent
Alumni of History Faculty Newsletter, Oxford
Obituary in The Guardian
Obituary in The Times
Obituary in The Daily Telegraph
May 2011 meeting of SAHGB in Oxford: "ARCHITECTURAL HISTORY AFTER COLVIN"
The Howard Colvin Archive Research notes and correspondence

1919 births
2007 deaths
English architectural historians
British biographers
British art historians
English architecture writers
Knights Bachelor
Commanders of the Royal Victorian Order
Commanders of the Order of the British Empire
Fellows of St John's College, Oxford
Alumni of University College London
People from Sidcup
20th-century biographers
Fellows of the British Academy
Fellows of the Royal Historical Society
People of the Royal Commission on the Historical Monuments of England